Sants  may refer to:
 Sants, a neighborhood in Barcelona, Catalonia, Spain
 Hector Sants, a British investment banker

See also
 Sant (disambiguation)